A. niger  may refer to:
 Acromyrmex niger, an ant species found in southern Brazil and Paraguay
 Agelastes niger, the black guineafowl, a bird species found in humid forests of Central Africa
 Allocyttus niger, the black oreo, a fish species found around Australia and New Zealand
 Andricus niger, a gall wasp species in the genus Andricus
 Aspergillus niger, the black mold, a fungus species

See also
 Niger (disambiguation)